Where I Find My Heaven + Flippin' Out is a compilation album by Gigolo Aunts released in the UK in 2003 on Fire Records.  The album combines an expanded version of Where I Find My Heaven and the UK version of Flippin' Out into a single release on two compact discs.  This compilation adds two additional tracks to Where I Find My Heaven, "Supernova Crush" and "Little Carl".

Track listing
UK Version (Fire Records) Catalog Number: SFIRE 011CD (2003)

Disc One

"Cope"  (Brouwer, Gibbs, Hurley, Hurley)  3:50
"Bloom"  (Brouwer, Gibbs, Hurley, Hurley)  4:00
"That's O.K."  (Brouwer, Gibbs, Hurley, Hurley)  3:59
"Gun"  (Brouwer, Gibbs, Hurley, Hurley)  4:40
"Take Me On"  (Brouwer, Gibbs, Hurley, Hurley)  2:34
"Walk Among Us"  (Brouwer, Gibbs, Hurley, Hurley)  4:21
"Serious Drugs"  (Duglas T. Stewart, Norman Blake, Joe McAlinden)  3:57
"Mrs. Washington"  (Brouwer, Gibbs, Hurley, Hurley)  4:06
"Ask"  (Morrissey/Johnny Marr)  2:24
"Supernova Crush"  (Brouwer, Gibbs, Hurley, Hurley)  2:17
"Winsor Dam"  (Bill Goffrier, Jeff Oliphant, Steve Michener, Gary Waleik)  4:40
"Where I Find My Heaven"  (Brouwer, Gibbs, Hurley, Hurley)  3:25
"Ride On Baby Ride On"  (Brouwer, Gibbs, Hurley, Hurley)  5:17
"Lemon Peeler"  (Brouwer, Gibbs, Hurley, Hurley)  3:28
"Shame"  (Brouwer, Gibbs, Hurley, Hurley)  4:03
"Weird Sister"  (Brouwer, Gibbs, Hurley, Hurley)  3:53
"Little Carl"  (Gigolo Aunts)   1:55

Disc Two

"Cope"  (Brouwer, Gibbs, Hurley, Hurley)  3:49
"Where I Find My Heaven"  (Brouwer, Gibbs, Hurley, Hurley)  3:23
"Lullaby"  (Brouwer, Gibbs, Hurley, Hurley)  5:06
"Easy Reader"  (Brouwer, Gibbs, Hurley, Hurley)  3:55
"Figurine"  (Brouwer, Gibbs, Hurley, Hurley)  5:01
"Mrs. Washington"  (Brouwer, Gibbs, Hurley, Hurley)  4:48
"Bloom"  (Brouwer, Gibbs, Hurley, Hurley)  4:01
"Gun"  (Brouwer, Gibbs, Hurley, Hurley)  4:38
"Pin Cushion"  (Brouwer, Gibbs, Hurley, Hurley)  4:41
"Flippin' Out"  (Vincent Casey)  6:10

References

2003 compilation albums
Gigolo Aunts albums